Highland Road Community Park or Highland Road Park, is a  public park in Baton Rouge, Louisiana. The Recreation and Park Commission for the Parish of East Baton Rouge (BREC) owns and operates the park.

The park is the home course for the LSU Tigers cross country and LSU Lady Tigers cross country teams.

Park amenities

Baseball Fields
Youth baseball and tee ball fields are located in the park.

Boat Launch
The boat launch at the park provides paddling access to Bayou Fountain and Bayou Manchac.

Cross Country
Highland Road Park is the home course for the LSU Tigers cross country and LSU Lady Tigers cross country teams. LHSAA cross country races are also held in the park.

Disc Golf
The disc golf course is located on the rolling hills section of the park.

Highland Road Park Observatory
The Highland Road Park Observatory sponsored by BREC, the LSU Department of Physics and Astronomy and the Baton Rouge Astronomical Society is located on the south side of the Park.

Recreation Center and playground area
This area offers an indoor gymnasium and rooms that can be used for events. A splash pad and pavilion are located in this area of the park.

Rugby and soccer
The Baton Rouge Rugby Football Club field and soccer field is located in the northern field of the park next to the recreation center.

Tennis Center
Tennis courts and a tennis academy are located in the park.  The Highland Park Tennis Association, developed in 1976, hosts round robin events every Saturday morning at Highland Road Community Park.  The Round Robin brings together on average 75 players of all levels interested in fun, competitive doubles tennis.  For more information and schedule, visit http://www.hptabr.org/

Walking Path
A walking path is located in the park.

Gallery

References

Baseball venues in Baton Rouge, Louisiana
College cross country courses in the United States
Cross country running courses in Louisiana
LSU Tigers and Lady Tigers cross country courses
Rugby union stadiums in Louisiana
Soccer venues in Louisiana
Sports venues in Baton Rouge, Louisiana
Tennis venues in Baton Rouge, Louisiana